Chaiyo is a district (amphoe) in the eastern part of Ang Thong province in Thailand.

History
The name Ban Chaiyo dates back to when King Naresuan the Great and his brother, who later became King Ekathotsarot, defeated the King of Lan Na and Burmese soldiers in this area. The soldiers of Ayutthaya shouted Chaiyo (ไชโย, "hurrah") to celebrate.

In the past, Chaiyo was called Ban Makham. When it was officially promoted to a district, the government selected the name "Chaiyo"  because of its storied past.

Geography
Neighboring districts are (from the north clockwise): Phrom Buri of Sing Buri province, Tha Wung, and Mueang Lopburi of Lopburi province; Ban Phraek and Maha Rat of Ayutthaya province; and Mueang Ang Thong and Pho Thong of Ang Thong Province.

Administration
The district is divided into nine sub-districts (tambons), which are further subdivided into 56 villages (mubans). There are two townships (thesaban tambons) in the district. Chorakhe Rong covers tambons Chorakhe Rong, Chaiyaphum, Lak Fa, Chawai, Tri Narong, and parts of Chaiyarit. Tambon Chaiyo is completely covered by the township Ket Chaiyo..

Chaiyo